The Bambukic  Trans-Benue or Yungur–Jen languages form a proposed branch of the provisional Savanna languages, a reduced form of the Waja–Jen branch of the old Adamawa languages family (G7, G9, G10). They are spoken in north eastern Nigeria. Their unity is not accepted by Güldemann (2018).

Bennett (1983) had also proposed a Trans-Benue group consisting of the Burak-Jen (i.e., Bikwin-Jen), Yungur (i.e., Bena-Mboi), and Tula-Longuda subgroups.

Languages
Blench (2006) groups the Yungur (G7), Bikwin–Jen (G9), and Longuda (G10) languages together within part of a larger Gur–Adamawa language continuum.

Bikwin–Jen
Jen: Dza (Jen), Mingang Doso, Tha, Joole
Bikwin: Burak–Loo, Mághdì, Mak, Moo (Gomu) – Leelau (Bikwin) – Kyak (Bambuka)
Longuda
Yungur (Bəna–Mboi)
Kaan (Libo)
Mboi (Gəna, Banga, Handa)
Yungur–Roba: Lala-Roba, Voro, Bəna

Kleinewillinghöfer (1996) notes the affinities of the Bikwin languages, which were unknown to Greenberg, with the Jen languages. Subclassification follows Blench (2004).

The Waja languages were once thought to belong to this group, but are now placed with the Kam language. (See Adamawa languages.)

References

External links
Bikwin-Jen (Adamawa Languages Project)
Ɓəna-Mboi (Yungur) group (Adamawa Languages Project)
Bena-Yungur (AdaGram)

 
Languages of Nigeria